Andreas Bless (born 7 July 1987) is a Swiss darts player who plays in Professional Darts Corporation events.

In 2018, he competed in the 2018 PDC World Cup of Darts alongside Alex Fehlmann, where they defeated China in the first round, before losing to the Wales pairing of Gerwyn Price and Jonny Clayton.

References

External links

1987 births
Living people
Swiss darts players
Professional Darts Corporation associate players
PDC World Cup of Darts Swiss team
People from Winterthur
Sportspeople from the canton of Zürich